The Palomar globular clusters are some of the faintest of all globular clusters in the Milky Way galaxy, and been discovered in the 1950s on the survey plates of the first Palomar Observatory Sky Survey (POSS). In total there are 15 Palomar globular clusters, which include Palomar 1, Palomar 2, Palomar 3, Palomar 4, Palomar 5, Palomar 6, Palomar 7, Palomar 8 Palomar 9, Palomar 10, Palomar 11, Palomar 12, Palomar 13, Palomar 14, and Palomar 15. Some Palomar Globulars, like Palomar 6, Palomar 7, Palomar 9, Palomar 10 and Palomar 11 are clusters of average size located nearby, yet obscured in our line of sight by dust. Other Palomar globulars, like Palomar 3, Palomar 4 and Palomar 14 are giants located in the far outer halo of the Milky Way. Observation of different Palomar globulars greatly varies in the degree of difficulty depending on the cluster.

History 
The Palomar globulars have been discovered fairly late due to them being very faint, heavily obscured, remotely located or having few member stars. For this reason, these were discovered only with the enormous 48-inch Schmidt camera at Palomar. Some of the astronomers who identified these objects as globular clusters include George Abell, Fritz Zwicky, Edwin Hubble, Halton Arp and Walter Baade. All Palomar globulars except two, Palomar 7 (IC1276) and Palomar 9 (NGC6717), have never been seen before. Palomar 9, for example, was observed by William Herschel back on August 7, 1784. Palomar 7 was first discovered by an American astronomer Lewis Swift in 1889, and was independently rediscovered by George Abell as part of the survey in 1952.

Palomar globulars catalogue

Visual observation 
The Palomar globulars can be observed and identified by amateur astronomers, however dark skies and high power are required. Astronomers have made reports on visual observations using 17.5 inch and larger telescopes. Overall, there is great variability in the level of difficulty to observe these objects, yet, for successful observation, skies with no light-pollution and excellent seeing conditions coupled with high power (at least 200 power magnification) are necessary. Many Palomars are small objects and require the observer to know how to navigate the sky precisely, and rely on averted vision when needed. In some Palomars, visual observers can resolve individual stars, while others look hazy. Palomar 9 (NGC 6717) is the easiest object to observe of the Palomar globulars, while Palomar 15 is regarded as the most difficult.

Additional resources 
Amateur sketches and visual observation notes on Palomar globulars

Images and short descriptions of Palomar globulars

Viewing tips on observing Palomar globulars

Database for Milky Way globular clusters (including Palomar globulars)

Cloudy Nights forum discussion topic on visual observation of Palomar globulars

References 

Globular clusters
Milky Way